The Taxi Aereo el Venado Douglas DC-4 accident occurred on 15 January 1976 when DC-4 HK-127, crashed  from Bogota when it hit a mountain and was destroyed killing all 13 on board.

Accident
The aircraft was on a domestic charter flight from Bogota-Eldorado Airport to La Macarena Airport with three crew and ten passengers. The aircraft took-off at 11:37 and the pilot reported his departure and said he would call at the next reporting point over El Boqueron. Nothing else was heard from the aircraft despite attempts by Air Traffic Control to contact them. Three hours later the local authorities in Chipaque reported that an aircraft had hit one of the peaks of the Western Cordilera at a height , which had been hidden by clouds.

Aircraft
The four-engined Douglas DC-4, former military Douglas C-54E, registered HK-127, was built in the United States by Douglas in Chicago. Construction / number 10280, was delivered to the United States Army Air Force (USAAF) on 26 January 1944 and was sold after the war to Pan Am, later Avianca, until sold in 1972 to Taxi Aereo el Venado.

References

Aviation accidents and incidents in 1976
1976 in Colombia
Airliner accidents and incidents involving controlled flight into terrain
Accidents and incidents involving the Douglas DC-4
Aviation accidents and incidents in Colombia
January 1976 events in South America